Aravantigepura is a place in the outskirts of Anekal town in the southern state of Karnataka, India. It is located in the Anekal taluk of Bangalore Urban district.

References

Villages in Bangalore Urban district